Bairro Araújo is a region of Rio de Janeiro, but not officially recognized as a neighborhood.localizado em Vista Alegre

References

Geography of Rio de Janeiro (city)